The Cordillera de Mérida is a series of mountain ranges, or massif, in northwestern Venezuela. The Cordillera de Mérida is a northeastern extension of the Andes Mountains and the most important branch of the Venezuelan Andes. The ranges run southwest–northeast between the Venezuelan-Colombian border and the Venezuelan Coastal Ranges. The Táchira depression separates the Cordillera de Mérida from the Cordillera Oriental, which forms the Colombia-Venezuela border.

The ranges runs from southwest to northeast and parts lie within each of the following states: Táchira, Mérida, Barinas, Trujillo, Portuguesa and Lara. The southeastern slopes are drained by tributaries of the Orinoco River, while the streams that drain the northwestern slopes empty into Lake Maracaibo. At the northeast tip of the massif lies the town of Barquisimeto and the headwaters of the River Cojedes.
In the centre of the massif is the city of Mérida. Two ranges of peaks lie on either side of the city, the Sierra de la Culata to the north and Sierra Nevada de Mérida to the south. Pico Bolívar, at 4,981 meters elevation (16,342 feet), is the highest peak in Venezuela.

Most of the ranges are covered by Venezuelan Andes montane forests, although the highest elevations (above 3,100 meters) are above tree line.  These ranges are home to the Cordillera de Mérida páramo, an enclave of the páramo (tropical alpine grasslands) of the northern Andes. Protected areas in the massif include Sierra Nevada National Park and Sierra La Culata National Park.

One glacier, the Humboldt glacier, is located in this mountain range, in which the snowy season is July–August. Snow typically covers the mountains above 4,200 meters, and sometimes above 3,800 meters.

External links

References

Mountain ranges of the Andes
Merida
Geography of Táchira
Geography of Mérida (state)
Geography of Barinas (state)
Geography of Trujillo (state)
Geography of Portuguesa (state)
Geography of Lara (state)
Páramos